Sudbury Hill is a London Underground station on the Uxbridge branch of the Piccadilly line. The station is between Sudbury Town and South Harrow, and is in Travelcard Zone 4. It is located on Greenford Road (A4127) north of the junction with Whitton Avenue, on the border between the London Boroughs of Harrow and Ealing. The station is close to Sudbury Hill Harrow railway station.

History
Sudbury Hill station was opened on 28 June 1903 by the District Railway (DR, now the District line) on its new extension to South Harrow from Park Royal & Twyford Abbey.

This new extension was, together with the existing tracks back to Acton Town, the first section of the Underground's surface lines to be electrified and operate electric instead of steam trains. The deep-level tube lines open at that time (City & South London Railway, Waterloo & City Railway and Central London Railway) had been electrically powered from the start.

The original station building was demolished in 1930 and 1931 and replaced by a new station in preparation for the handover of the branch from the District line to the Piccadilly line. The new station was designed by Charles Holden in a modern European style using brick, reinforced concrete and glass. Like the stations at Sudbury Town and Alperton to the south as well as others that Holden designed elsewhere for the east and west Piccadilly line extensions such as Acton Town and Oakwood, Sudbury Hill station features a tall block-like ticket hall rising above a low horizontal structure that contains station facilities and shops. The brick walls of the ticket hall are punctuated with panels of clerestory windows and the structure is capped with a flat concrete slab roof.

On 4 July 1932 the Piccadilly line was extended to run west of its original terminus at Hammersmith sharing the route with the District line to Ealing Common. From Ealing Common to South Harrow, the District line was replaced by the Piccadilly line.

The station was made a Grade II Listed Building on 17 May 1994.

In 2018, it was announced that the station would gain step free access by 2022, as part of a £200m investment to increase the number of accessible stations on the Tube. This was achieved on 30 December 2021 with the installation of two lifts.

Services
The off-peak service in trains per hour (tph) is:
6tph to Cockfosters (Eastbound)
3tph to Rayners Lane (Westbound)
3tph to Uxbridge via Rayners Lane (Westbound)

The peak time service in trains per hour (tph) is:
12tph to Cockfosters (Eastbound)
6tph to Rayners Lane (Westbound)
6tph to Uxbridge via Rayners Lane (Westbound)

Connections
London Buses routes 92 and H17 serve the station.

Gallery

See also
 Sudbury Hill Harrow Station
 Sudbury & Harrow Road Station

References

External links

 

Tube stations in the London Borough of Harrow
Former Metropolitan District Railway stations
Railway stations in Great Britain opened in 1903
Piccadilly line stations
Charles Holden railway stations
Grade II* listed buildings in the London Borough of Harrow
Grade II* listed railway stations